This is a list of assemblies of the Legislative Assembly of Nunavut, the legislature of the Canadian territory of Nunavut, since its creation as a Canadian territory on April 1, 1999. The first legislative assembly of Nunavut was formed in 1999, after the 1999 Nunavut general election. The Nunavut territorial legislature uses a consensus government system without political parties, and the premier is chosen by and from the members of the assembly.

List of Parliaments

Notes and references

Legislative Assemblies